Wegger Christian Strømmen (born 14 June 1959) is a Norwegian diplomat and politician who is Political Director of the Norwegian Ministry of Foreign Affairs.

He was born in Larvik, Norway and holds a master's of law degree from the University of Oslo Law School. Wegger Christian Strømmen became Norwegian Ambassador to the United Kingdom in January 2019. He was Norwegian Ambassador to the United States in 2007–2013.

He served as Norway's permanent representative and ambassador to the United Nations and other international organizations in Geneva from 2005 to 2007, acted as deputy permanent representative of Norway's Permanent Mission to the United Nations in New York from 2002 to 2005, as well as deputy permanent representative to the U.N. Security Council and chairman of the Security Council Working Group on Peacekeeping Operations from 2000 to 2002 

In addition, he has been a visiting fellow at the International Institute for Strategic Studies in London from 2000.

Ambassador Strømmen, who joined the Norwegian Diplomatic Service in 1984, served as first secretary to the Norwegian Permanent Mission in Geneva from 1991 to 1993 and to the Norwegian Embassy in Tel Aviv, Israel from 1988 to 1991.

From 1993 to 1995 he was a special advisor to Thorvald Stoltenberg. Other postings in the ministry include head of the legal department(1995–96) and executive officer (1984–86) in the Legal Department. From 1998 to 2000 he served as a State Secretary in the Ministry of Foreign Affairs as a part of the Bondevik's First Cabinet.

Ambassador Strømmen's law background includes serving as an attorney and then a partner in the law firm of Wiersholm, Mellbye & Beech (1996–98) in Oslo, legal advisor to the co-chairman of the European Union-United Nations International Conference on the former Yugoslavia (1993–95), and a junior district court judge in Norway (1986–87).

He has lectured on international law at Harvard, Columbia, New York University, Georgetown, Stanford, the University of Bergen and University of Oslo.

He is married and has two daughters and a son.

References 

1959 births
Living people
Norwegian civil servants
Ambassadors of Norway to the United States
People from Larvik
Christian Democratic Party (Norway) politicians
Norwegian state secretaries
Permanent Representatives of Norway to the United Nations